Presidential elections were held in Somalia on 23 December 1986, the first time a direct election for President had been held. The country was a one-party state at the time, with the Somali Revolutionary Socialist Party (SRSP) as the sole legal political party. Its leader, incumbent President Siad Barre, was the only candidate. He was re-elected with fewer than 1,500 votes against his candidacy.

Results

References

Somalia
1986 in Somalia
Presidential elections in Somalia
One-party elections
Single-candidate elections
December 1986 events in Africa
Election and referendum articles with incomplete results